Mikalai Shubianok (born 4 May 1985 in Gomel) is a decathlete from Belarus. He set his personal best score (8028 points) in the men's decathlon on 19 May 2007 in Minsk. His first name is sometimes also spelled as Nikolay.

Achievements

External links
 
 

1985 births
Living people
Belarusian decathletes
Athletes (track and field) at the 2008 Summer Olympics
Olympic athletes of Belarus
Sportspeople from Gomel
Universiade medalists in athletics (track and field)
Universiade gold medalists for Belarus
Competitors at the 2007 Summer Universiade
Competitors at the 2011 Summer Universiade
Medalists at the 2009 Summer Universiade